CNews (stylised as CNEWS, formerly i>Télé) is a French free-to-air news channel launched on 4 November 1999 by Canal+ Group. It provides 24-hour national and global news coverage. It is the second most watched news network in France, after BFM TV and before LCI and France Info. i>Télé was renamed CNews on 27 February 2017. It has a right-wing editorial stance, and is often compared to the American TV channel Fox News.

The channel is under the control of the media proprietor and business magnate Vincent Bolloré, who has been accused of interfering with the editorial choices of the CNews.

Presenters

Politics 
 Julien Nény (since 2016)
 Yoan Usaï (since 2013)
 Loïc Signor (since 2016)
 Hugues Dago (since 2016)

Economy and Stock Markets  
 Marie-Sophie Carpentier (2008-2012)

Culture 
 Olivier Benkemoun (since 1999)
 Xavier Leherpeur (depuis 2013)
 Pierre Zeni, cinema specialist (depuis 2016)
 Laurent Weil (since 2016)

Business and Markets 
 Johann Ouaki (since 2017)
 Sandy Prenois (since 2017)

Sports 
 Pascal Praud (since 2010)
 Julien Pasquet (since 2009)
 Elodie Poyade (2012, since 2016)
 Sonia Carneiro (since 2013)
 Thibaud Vézirian (since 2017)
 Thibaut Geffrotin (since 2017)
 Lyès Houhou (from Infosport+)
 Paul Tchoukriel (from Infosport+)
 Virginie Ramel (since 2017)
 Arnaud Bonnin (since 2017)

Football 
 Francesca Antoniotti
 Raymond Aabou
 Jean-Luc Arribart
 Pierre Ménès
 Gilles Verdez
 Alain Roche
 Bruno Ahoyo

Police-justice specialists 
 Noémie Schulz (since 3/2016)
 Sandra Buisson (since 2012)

"International questions" specialist 
 Harold Hyman (since 2016)

Weather 
 Thierry Fréret (since 2010)
 Loïc Rousval (since 2015)
 Alexandra Blanc (2011-2013 and since 2016)
 Somaya Labidi

Political editors 
 Gérard Leclerc (since 3/2017)
 Yves Thréard (since 2012)
 Virginie Le Guay (since 2017)
 Jean-Claude Dassier (since 2013)
 Françoise Degois (2014-2016 and since 2017)

Regional correspondents 
 Damien Deparnay (Lille and Nord-Pas de Calais)
 Olivier Madinier (Lyon and Rhône-Alpes)
 Romain Ripoteau (Languedoc-Roussillon and Midi-Pyrénées)
 Jean-Luc Thomas (Toulouse)
 Jean-Michel Decazes and Michaël Chaillou (Bretagne and Pays de La Loire)
 Sébastien Bendotti (Bureau de Lyon and Rhône-Alpes)
 David Brunet (Strasbourg)
 Stéphanie Rouquié (Marseille)
 Antoine Estève and Brice Bachon (Bordeaux)

Former presenters

Editor 
 Yann Moix (2014–2015)

Staff

Present news anchors and analysts 
 Claire-Élisabeth Beaufort
 Soizic Boisard 
 Patrice Boisfer
 Virginie Chomicki
 Nelly Daynac 
 Caroline Delage 
 Romain Desarbres
 Laurence Ferrari
 Olivier Galzi 
 Thomas Lequertier
 Clélie Mathias
 Marc Menant
 Isabelle Moreau
 Patrick Poivre d'Arvor
 Pascal Praud
 Audrey Pulvar 
 Aïda Touihri
 Éric Zemmour

Past anchors 
 Harry Roselmack (currently on TF1)
 Guillaume Durand (currently on Paris Première and Radio Classique)
 Thomas Hugues (currently on France 5)
 Maya Lauqué (currently on France 5)
 Thomas Thouroude (currently on Canal+)
 Bruce Toussaint (currently on France 5)
 Amandine Bégot (currently on LCI)
 Laurent Bazin
 Sonia Chironi
 Marie-Sophie Carpentier

Controversy 
According to satirical and investigative media Le Canard Enchaîné and leftist activist group Sleeping Giants France, CNews, owned by Groupe Bolloré and Vincent Bolloré, clearly supports conservative and far-right journalists, who are promoting racist discourse. Éric Zemmour, in particular, was condemned on 17 September 2020, for racial hatred. With its promotion of ideas of the extreme right, and spreading so-called conspiracy theories, the channel has been described as a French version of Fox News.

Viewership 
A 2021 CSA poll for the channel found that 27% of its viewers identified with the left, 9% with the centre and 24% with the right, 9% identified with Marine Le Pen far-right National Rally party. A total of 40% of viewers either did not identify with a party or did not say.

Slogans 

 1999–2001: "i> l'info se rapproche" (i> news is getting closer)
 2001–2002: "Là où ça se passe, 24 h sur 24" (Wherever it's happening, 24/7)
 2002–2007: "L'info en +" (News in +)
 2007–2008: "Toutes les infos, tout le temps" (All the news, all the time)
 2008–2009: "Au cœur de l'actualité" (At the heart of the news)
 2009–2010: "L'information avec un grand I" (News with a big I)
 2010–2011: "Soyez les premiers à voir les images" (Be the first to see the images)
 2011–2013: "Au plus près de l'actualité 24h/24" (Closer to the news 24/7)
 2013–2014: "Au cœur de l'événement" (At the heart of the event)
 2014–2017: "L'information ne s'arrête jamais" (The news never stops)
 February - November 2017: "La chaîne info : décryptage et opinions" (The news channel: decoding and opinions)
 November 2017 – 2021: "La chaîne info qui explique l'info" (The news channel that explains the news)
 June 2021: "Venez avec vos convictions, vous vous ferez une opinion." (Come with your convictions, you'll form an opinion.)

References

External links 
  Official website
  Official website

Canal+
Conservatism in France
Conservative media in France
Television stations in France
Television channels and stations established in 1999
1999 establishments in France
French-language television stations
24-hour television news channels in France